Pisacane is a surname. Notable people with the surname include:

 Carlo Pisacane (1818–1857), Italian patriot and socialist
 Carlo Pisacane (actor) (1889–1974), Italian actor
 Fabio Pisacane (born 1986), Italian footballer and coach

Surnames of Italian origin